Thauera is a genus of Gram-negative bacteria in the family Zoogloeaceae of the order Rhodocyclales of the Betaproteobacteria. The genus is named for the German microbiologist Rudolf Thauer. Most species of this genus are motile by flagella and are mostly rod-shaped. The species occur in wet soil and polluted freshwater.

Species
The genus includes the following species:

 T. aminoaromatica
 T. aromatica
 T. butanivorans
 T. chlorobenzoica
 T. humireducens
 T. linaloolentis
 T. mechernichensis
 T. phenylacetica
 T. propionica
 T. selenatis
 T. terpenica

References

Zoogloeaceae
Rhodocyclales
Betaproteobacteria
Bacteria genera